Z-Out is a horizontally scrolling shooter released for the Amiga and Atari ST by Rainbow Arts in 1990. It is the sequel to X-Out, adding two-player co-operative play.

Gameplay

Reception
While its critical reception was positive—particular praise went to its graphics—many reviewers noted that the game was unoriginal.

References

External links
Z-Out at Lemon Amiga
Z-Out at Atari Mania

1990 video games
Amiga games
Atari ST games
Europe-exclusive video games
Horizontally scrolling shooters
Video games developed in Germany
Video game sequels
Video games scored by Chris Huelsbeck
Multiplayer and single-player video games
Rainbow Arts games